Ek Tha Tiger is a 2012 Indian Hindi-language action thriller film directed by Kabir Khan and co-written by Khan and Neelesh Misra, from a story by and produced by Aditya Chopra. It is the first installment in the Tiger franchise and the first film in the YRF Spy Universe. It stars Salman Khan and Katrina Kaif, with Ranvir Shorey, Roshan Seth, Girish Karnad, and Gavie Chahal in supporting roles. In the film, Avinash "Tiger" Singh Rathore (Khan), an Indian spy, is tasked with recovering information before it is gained by Pakistan, but is sidetracked after falling in love with Zoya Humaimi (Kaif).

Ek Tha Tiger is the third collaboration between Kabir Khan and Yash Raj Films, after he directed Kabul Express (2006) and New York (2009), and the first collaboration between Yash Raj and Salman Khan. The last film made with involvement by Yash Raj founder Yash Chopra, Ek Tha Tiger had a complicated production process, with delays, rewrites, and several cast members attached at various points. Principal photography began in August 2011 and lasted until July 2012, with filming locations including Dublin, Havana, Bangkok, Istanbul, and Delhi. The film's music was composed primarily by Sohail Sen, with the soundtrack's lead single and the film's theme song, "Mashallah", composed by Sajid-Wajid. Originally set for release in June 2012, the film was theatrically released worldwide by Yash Raj on 15 August 2012.  

The film received mixed-to-positive reviews, with praise for its action sequences, music, and performances of its leads, while there was some criticism for its tone, which was labelled inconsistent. Ek Tha Tiger set numerous box-office records in its theatrical run, grossing  worldwide. The film won Best Special Effects at the 14th IIFA Awards and won five People's Choice Awards, including Best Film, Best Actor for Khan, and Best Actress for Kaif.

A sequel, Tiger Zinda Hai, was released on 22 December 2017. A third film, Tiger 3, was announced in June 2018.

Plot
 
Avinash "Tiger" Singh Rathore, a RAW officer, is forced to kill Rabinder, one of his men, for defecting to Pakistan's spy agency ISI while in Iraq. Disappointed his missions always feature violence, Tiger is next deployed by his boss, Shenoy, on a mission in Dublin to observe Anwar Kidwai. Kidwai is a science professor of Indian origin who teaches at Trinity College and is suspected of undertaking novel nuclear weapons research, which RAW wish to gain before Pakistan. Tiger's handler, Gopi, accompanies him on this mission.

Tiger poses as Manish Chandra, a non-fiction author writing a book on Kidwai and other Indian academics. To gain access to his house, Tiger befriends Kidwai's caretaker, a British-Indian Trinity College dance student named Zoya. Over time, Tiger and Zoya fall in love, and she invites him to "My Son, Pinocchio", a college play sponsored by Kidwai and choreographed by Zoya. A few days later, Tiger is attacked by a mystery assailant, with him and Gopi fearing their identities have been compromised. After seeing the assailant on the day of the play, Tiger chases him through Dublin, which leads to Tiger publicly preventing a Luas train crash. During the play, Gopi calls Tiger to inform him of activity at Kidwai's house; there, Tiger discovers Zoya is an ISI agent tasked on the same mission as him, extracting Kidwai's research from his computer.

Zoya refuses to commit treason and rejects his request for her to hand over the research. Tiger lets her go after combating an attack by Feroz, an ISI agent, who is revealed to be Tiger's mystery assailant. Back in India, Tiger asks to be removed from field duty, instead completing analysis work with his colleague, Bagga. Bagga informs him of an intercepted Pakistani secret message, which was planted by Zoya for Tiger, informing him of her planned arrival at an upcoming UN meeting in Istanbul. Tiger and Zoya meet and they decide to elope; after misleading their respective agencies to Nur-Sultan, Tiger and Zoya travel to Havana. Some time later, Tiger and Zoya are tracked down when they foil a mugging attempt, with video surveillance reaching RAW and ISI.

Being spotted at an amateur boxing match, the couple makes plans to and attempt to flee law enforcement and leave Havana, but Zoya is arrested by the Cuban police and handed over to the ISI to be extradited to Pakistan. Tiger then meets Gopi, stating Zoya will cooperate with RAW in exchange for her escape. Tiger and Gopi lead a team to intercept Zoya's prisoner transport convoy, but Tiger and Zoya flee Cuba in a light aircraft they had stationed in a nearby field after he is non-fatally shot by Gopi. Sometime later, Tiger calls Shenoy and informs him he and Zoya will return to their home countries when Pakistan and India no longer need the ISI and RAW. 

In the epilogue, several sightings of Tiger and Zoya are reported in Venice, Cape Town, Zurich, and London.

Cast

 Salman Khan as Avinash "Tiger" Singh Rathore, a RAW agent who goes undercover under the alias Manish Chandra to spy on Anwar Kidwai. 
 Katrina Kaif as Zoya "Zee" Humaimi, an ISI agent who goes undercover to counteract the efforts of Tiger. 
 Ranvir Shorey as Gopi Arya, a RAW agent and Tiger's handler.
 Roshan Seth as Anwar Kidwai, an Indian scientist and university professor whose missile research is sought by RAW and the ISI.
 Girish Karnad as Shenoy, the chief of RAW, who deeply dislikes Pakistan.
 Gavie Chahal as Abrar, a section captain of the ISI.

Samar Jai Singh appears as Rabinder, a RAW agent who defects to the ISI. Rajender Sethi features as Bagga, a tech analyst for RAW and friend to both Tiger and Shenoy. Troi Ge Borde also features as Feroz, an ISI agent.

Production

Development
After Kabir Khan was announced as director to a then-untitled action film, he approached Shah Rukh Khan with a draft of the screenplay. Although interested, Khan could not star in the film due to scheduling conflicts with Don 2 (2011) and Jab Tak Hai Jaan (2012). This allowed the film's screenplay, which had been completed in November 2010, to undergo changes well into shooting, including as late as February 2012. In May 2011, several reports confirmed Salman Khan and Katrina Kaif would star in a film titled Ek Tha Tiger. It would be Khan's first venture with Yash Raj Films, and the pair's fourth film together, after Maine Pyaar Kyun Kiya? (2005), Partner (2007), and Yuvvraaj (2008). In order to begin filming, Khan had to postpone the development of Sher Khan, a yet unrealized project he began developing with his brother, Sohail Khan. Khan was paid a reported  to star in the film. Kaif, who only appeared in one action film prior to Ek Tha Tiger (2008's Race), performed her own stunts.

Kabir Khan wrote scenes specifically to include Trinity College, considering it "a character of repute"; he had previously visited the university in mid-1995 to interview then Irish President Mary Robinson. According to Avtar
Panesar, Vice President of International Operations at Yash Raj, all locations were ultimately motivated by the screenplay, stating "if it fits the script, if it works, we then make use of the country as a location".

The rest of the cast was finalized over the following year; Ranvir Shorey signed on in April 2012, while the film marks the Bollywood debut of Gavie Chahal, who previously appeared in Punjabi films. On May 3, 2012, a photography shoot was held with the cast. After release, the film was subject to a copyright dispute after writer Anand Panda lodged a police complaint, backed by the Screenwriters Association, claiming the filmmakers stole his screenplay. Kabir Khan and Aditya Chopra were sent first information reports under charges of cheating, criminal breach of trust, and violation of the Copyright Act. Khan and Chopra subsequently filed an appeal to the Bombay High Court. In July 2012, a legal notice was served by the nephew of Ravindra Kaushik, a RAW agent known as Black Tiger, stating the film bears a striking resemblance to his uncle and his uncle's life.

Filming
The film's production contained a number of delays. Initial reports said principal photography would begin in July 2011, but a spokesperson for Yash Raj Films announced production had been delayed due to budgeting concerns. Filming began in August 2011 in Dublin, but was postponed after Salman Khan underwent surgery for trigeminal neuralgia in the United States, and when some crew members in Ireland held a demonstration over filming conditions and a lack of payment.

Filming resumed in September 2011 in Turkey, in Istanbul and near the border with Syria and Iraq. There, the crew faced security concerns when they were mistaken for a hostile threat by Turkish Land Forces, and were required to lie down for ten minutes at gunpoint while the issue was being resolved. Production took place in Dublin between 10 September and 14 October 2011, with scenes between Khan and Shorey filmed on Temple Bar. According to Naoise Barry, the Irish Film Commissioner, Screen Ireland and Tourism Ireland collectively sought to attract Bollywood productions to the country since 2004, citing India as an emerging market for tourism in Ireland. According to Aman Agrawal, a production executive for Yash Raj, Dublin was chosen to "allow the film to be international and encourage people outside India to connect to Bollywood" while maintaining "appeal to Indian audiences who love to see new places". Dublin City Council, Trinity College (which saw filming on campus for the first time in 20 years), and other agencies helped enable filming in the city by granting complimentary visas and allowing reduced costs with tax breaks.

Production was halted altogether in early 2012 to account for script re-writes, abandoning production in Hong Kong in favor of an eventual crunch-schedule three-day period in Delhi. Filming ended in June 2012 in Bangkok, Thailand. Stunt directors for The Bourne Identity (2002) coordinated the film's action sequences, some of which were shot on location. Khan used a self-created fitness program titled 'Dirty Running' for 30 days to prepare for the role. Kaif completed her scenes without makeup. Filming also took place in Havana, with the song "Lapaata" shot along the Malecón, the Torreón de la Chorrera, Plaza Vieja, and Havana Cathedral. The film was the first Bollywood film to shoot in Cuba. Khan also appeared in a commercial for both Cuban and Irish tourism companies.

Ek Tha Tiger was shot on film by cinematographer Aseem Mishra using a collection of Arri cameras, including the Arriflex 235, Arriflex 435, and the Arriflex 535, with Angenieux 24-290mm T2.8 and Zeiss Ultra Prime Lenses.

Music

The film's soundtrack was composed by Sohail Sen, although the film's end credits song "Mashallah" was composed by Sajid–Wajid. Reportedly, composer A. R. Rahman was approached to do the music of the film, which he agreed to and later backed out citing time constraints. Recording for the soundtrack began in 2011. After Rahman quit the project, the soundtrack was due to be composed by Pritam, who was credited for the music on the film's first digital poster. However, he dropped out following scheduling conflicts with Dhoom 3 (2013). As a result, Julius Packiam composed the score and Sohail Sen composed all songs except "Mashallah". Packiam and Kabir Khan are frequent collaborators, having worked together on Kabul Express (2006) and New York (2009).

Neelesh Misra, Anvita Dutt and Kausar Munir wrote the lyrics, and its remixes were produced by Joshilay. In late 2011, the song "Jaaniyan", recorded by Pakistani singer Bilawal Baloch, was leaked, and was reported to be included on the soundtrack. Yash Raj Films denied the song was to be on the soundtrack, and announced increased security measures to prevent leaks. The soundtrack was released by YRF Music on 1 August 2012.

Track listing

Critical response

The soundtrack received unanimously positive reviews. Glamsham gave the album a 4 out of 5, saying, "Ek Tha Tiger roars with multi-cultured international musical feel, a musician delight that primarily targets classy listeners. It [catches] every aura, genre and format". Indo-Asian News Service posting on CNN-IBN also rated the album a 4 out of 5, noting it "offers the listener the romantic and action of the [film], with an entertaining array of sounds".

Purva Desai of The Times of India and Devesh Sharma of Filmfare also gave the soundtrack a 4 out of 5, noting it as an improvement over the soundtracks of Salman Khan and Kabir Khan's previous films. They also praised the composers for their contemporary focus. Joginder Tuteja of Bollywood Hungama gave the album 3.5/5 and wrote "[it] is good, though one expected it to have gone all the way. [Nothing] puts you off, but the overall sound of the album remains more or less consistent".

Marketing
The film's poster was released in August 2011, and the first theatrical trailer was released in May 2012, debuting alongside the release of Ishaqzaade, another film produced by Yash Raj Films and Aditya Chopra. The trailer received over a million views on video sharing platform YouTube within two days of its release, making it the platform's most-viewed trailer for a Bollywood film at the time. As part of a publicity campaign for Trinity College, parts of the film and behind the scenes footage was shown in India, while interviews of South Asian students, university lecturers, and Ek Tha Tiger crew members were done.

The cast embarked on a limited domestic promotional tour, conducting press conferences in New Delhi, Ahmedabad, and Lucknow. They also signed a promotional deal with soft drink company Thums Up, where Khan and Kaif appeared in commercials. The company also sponsored an expanded tour in mid-2012, with the cast also visiting Mumbai, Hyderabad, Kanpur, Allahabad, Agra, Meerut, and Ghaziabad.

Six days after the film's release, Tourism Ireland's Indian Facebook page gained over 23,000 followers, up from 10,000 the previous week; over one year later, it accumulated around 90,000 followers. The Irish Central Statistics Office noted an increase in tourism from overseas after the film's release. In an interview, then-Minister for Transport, Tourism and Sport, Leo Varadkar, said Ek Tha Tiger "established a foundation" for future projects to be held in Ireland.

A two-part comic book series based on the film was also released. Published by Yomics, the series also features characters from Hum Tum (2004), which was also produced by Chopra and Yash Raj Films. Canonically, this sets the two films in one shared universe. The first comic book, Ek Tha Tiger: Mahasagar Ki Suraksha, was published in July 2012. The second, Ek Tha Tiger: Web Mein Pakra Gaya!, was released in November, to coincide with the film's release on home video. The series received mixed reviews, with praise for its design and criticism for its plot and pacing.

The film's lead single and main theme song, "Mashallah", recorded by Wajid Ali and Shreya Ghoshal, was released worldwide on 27 June 2012. The song's music was both composed and produced by Ali and his brother Sajid, while its lyrics were written by Kausar Munir. The filmi power ballad topped several music charts in India throughout August and remained in the top 10 for a majority of the film's theatrical run.

Release

Theatrical
Ek Tha Tiger was released worldwide on 15 August 2012; the date coincided with Indian Independence Day. The film was screened in 3300 domestic theaters, a record until broken by Dabangg 2, which was screened in 3700 theaters later that year. Ek Tha Tiger was released in 550 screens internationally, although, it was not released in Pakistana major market for Bollywooddue to concerns over the portrayal of Pakistan in the film. This decision was upheld despite opposition from Kabir Khan, who stated the film does not promote anti-Pakistani sentiment. The film premiered in Tokyo in July 2013, and was screened in 70 theaters in Japan, constituting the widest Japanese release for a Hindi-language Bollywood film. Approximately 60 percent of the film's opening weekend's gross had been collected from ticket pre-orders; Ek Tha Tiger was screened at Cineworld Dublin between 15 August and 3 September 2012 and was often sold out, while other theaters subsequently increased ticket prices.

The film was screened at Trinity College in September 2012, with Kabir Khan discussing its production with film and drama students.

Home media
Ek Tha Tiger was released on DVD by YRF Home Entertainment on 25 September 2012, and on Blu-ray, Blu-ray 3D, and Ultra HD Blu-ray on 9 October 2012. The digital and Blu-ray releases include behind-the-scenes featurettes, deleted scenes, and a blooper reel. The Blu-ray releases saw the home media introduction of Dolby TrueHD 96k upsampling and Dolby Surround 7.1 sound.

The physical releases in its first week of the sale were one of the top home media releases in India, according to The Numbers data. The Blu-ray version accounted for 79% of the sales, with 3% of total sales coming from the Ultra HD Blu-ray version.

Reception

Box office
It is also the highest-grossing Bollywood film of 2012, and became the second highest grossing Bollywood film of all time, after 3 Idiots (2009).

Internationally, Ek Tha Tiger also performed strongly, despite being banned in Pakistan. It grossed  in overseas markets in its five days of release.

Critical response
The review aggregator website Rotten Tomatoes reported a 71% approval rating with an average score of 5.9/10, based on 14 reviews. The website's critical consensus reads, "Salman Khan and Katrina Kaif dazzles in a rollicking, but sometimes ropey romantic action thriller". It polled higher with audiences, indicating a generally favorable filmgoer response.

In India, there was praise for the film's feminist themes, with Marjolaine Gout noting the film is "a roaring, visual, comic feast where the damsel-in-distress fights back", giving Ek Tha Tiger 3.5 out of 5 stars. Anupama Chopra of the Hindustan Times also commended the feminist themes, saying "it's such a pleasure to see a Hindi film heroine not [be] a damsel-in-distress", while also praising the film's action sequences, giving Ek Tha Tiger 3 out of 5 stars. Jahanavi Samant of Mid-Day gave the film the same rating and criticized its tone as being inconsistent, with "Ek Tha Tiger [being] unable to decide whether it is spy action or a love saga". Ronnie Scheib of Variety gave a positive review, praising the performances of the leads and film's production aesthetic, noting "Kaif impresses in her action-heroine debut, while Salman Khan's thinking-on-his-feet immediacy adds depth to his usual macho muscle. Local audiences will no doubt derive a special thrill from the onscreen reunion of stars Khan and Kaif, [with] Aseem Mishra's gorgeous location lensing".

Ek Tha Tiger faced harsher reception from Raja Sen of Rediff, who criticized the film's relative low stakes and pacing, noting "[Kabir] Khan scales down the ambition as he aims for a safe mainstream middle-ground in his Ek Tha Tiger, a spy-thriller which takes a while to get boiling but eventually crackles along quite effectively". He scored the film 2.5 stars out of 5, with his score and reception echoed by Rajeev Masand of CNN-IBN, who wrote "despite flaws, Ek Tha Tiger is extremely far from unwatchable. Just don't go in with very high expectations". Rachel Saltz of The New York Times praised the action scenes but also criticized the low stakes of the characters' romance, saying, "Tiger and Zoya [are] good kung fu street fighters, but unconvincing spies and cookie-cutter bland lovers. Their loyalty to each other is never in question and only tepidly tested". A similar critical reaction was noted by Josh Tuhin of Gulf News who blasted the cinematography, saying "[it] is outright bad, with the body doubles' faces visible during the action scenes", but praised Kaif and Khan's on-screen chemistry.

Regarding the film's depiction of Ireland, Giovanna Rampazzo wrote that despite Ek Tha Tiger presenting political themes, it "carefully avoided representing any complexity or social issues [in favour] of a charming and cosmopolitan Irish capital, constructing a simplistic image of Ireland that requires a minimum of cross-cultural understanding or critical engagement [by] the viewer". She concluded this was "in line with long-standing strategies supported by government agencies to create a marketable version of 'Irishness' [but] may promote unrealistic cognitive associations and expectations about Irish society". Overall, the country's presentation in the film was positively received by Irish audiences.

Accolades

Sequels

Tiger Zinda Hai

Kabir Khan was replaced by Ali Abbas Zafar as director, and the film's script was co-written by Zafar and Neelesh Misra. It released in India on December 22, 2017, and saw Salman Khan, Kaif, Chahal, and Girish Karnad returning, with Tiger Zinda Hai being Karnad's final Bollywood film before his death.

Tiger 3
A third film under the working title Tiger 3 was announced in June 2018.

See also

 Ravindra Kaushik

References

External links
 
 
 
 

2010s Hindi-language films
Films scored by Sohail Sen
Films scored by Sajid–Wajid
Indian spy thriller films
2010s spy thriller films
2012 films
Indian action thriller films
2012 action thriller films
India–Pakistan relations in popular culture
Films shot in Delhi
Films set in Delhi
Films set in Dublin (city)
Films shot in Dublin (city)
Indian chase films
2010s chase films
Yash Raj Films films
Indian action adventure films
2010s action adventure films
Films about the Research and Analysis Wing
Films shot in Istanbul
Films shot in Cuba
Films shot in the Republic of Ireland
Girls with guns films
Film censorship in Pakistan
Film controversies in Pakistan
Censored films
Films directed by Kabir Khan
Films shot in Havana
Films set in Cuba
Films set in Havana
Films adapted into comics